The 1993 Fort Lauderdale Strikers season was the fourth season of the team in the American Professional Soccer League.  It was the club's twenty-seventh season in professional soccer.  This year, the team finished in sixth place in the regular season.  They did not make it to the playoffs.

Background

Review

Competitions

APSL regular season

Results summaries

Results by round

Match reports

Statistics

Transfers

References 

1993
Fort Lauderdale Strikers
Fort Lauderdale Strikers